Chicago Park School District is a school district in Nevada County, California, United States.

Some of in the schools in the district include:
Chicago Park School

Chicago Park School 
This is a small school in the Chicago Park District, K-8, with the standard based academic curriculum of California. They have a before school GATE program and a state of the art science lab for the 4th through 8th grade.

References

External links
 

School districts in Nevada County, California